The Heritage Academy is a private institute located in Anandapur, Kolkata (Calcutta) near the East Kolkata Township,  in West Bengal, India in the same campus where the Heritage Institute of Technology, Kolkata and the Heritage School lies. It is affiliated to   Maulana Abul Kalam Azad University of Technology, West Bengal (formerly known as West Bengal University of Technology), Kolkata (WBUT).

Academics
The Heritage Academy provides technical education in management and technology in all technical and theoretical aspects in 3-year, full-time programs in Bachelor of Business Administration (BBA) honours, Bachelor of Media Science (BMS) honours and Bachelor of Computer Applications (BCA) honours.

Events 
The Heritage Academy facilitates quite a few fests and educational events. 

Epignosis is an inter college fest organized by The Heritage Academy. It was first started in 2019 and included a lot of sporting, cultural and technological events.

Heritage Academy Film Festival (HAFF) is the official film festival of The Heritage Academy and is organized by the Media science department of The Heritage Academy.

Ad Adda is an "Advertising, Entertainment, and Public Relations" fest organized by the Media science department of The Heritage Academy.
Features
The Heritage Academy is known for its good education and placements.

See also

References

External links
Official website

Educational institutions established in 2007
Universities and colleges in Kolkata
2007 establishments in West Bengal